Melanocytic tumors are tumors developed from melanocytes.

Types
 Melanocytic nevus
 Melanocytic tumors of uncertain malignant potential
 Melanoma

Tumor